Rensselaer County  is a county in the U.S. state of New York. As of the 2020 census, the population was 161,130. Its county seat is Troy. The county is named in honor of the family of Kiliaen van Rensselaer, the original Dutch owner of the land in the area.

Rensselaer County is part of the Albany-Schenectady-Troy, NY Metropolitan Statistical Area.

History

The area that is now Rensselaer County was inhabited by the Algonquian-speaking Mohican Indian tribe at the time of European encounter. Kiliaen van Rensselaer, a Dutch jeweler and merchant, purchased the area in 1630 and incorporated it in his patroonship Rensselaerswyck. (It was part of the Dutch colony New Netherland).

The land passed into English rule in 1664; the Dutch regained control in 1673, but the English took it back in 1674. Until 1776, the year of American independence, the county was under English or British control. The county was not organized as a legal entity until after the Revolution, in 1791, when it was created from an area that was originally part of the very large Albany County.

In 1807, in a county re-organization, the rural sections of Troy were set off as Towns, and the city was incorporated. The two towns created were Brunswick (named for Duke Friedrich Wilhelm of Braunschweig-Lüneburg) and Grafton (named for Henry FitzRoy, 5th Duke of Grafton). A third town, Philipstown, was set off in 1806. In 1808, it was renamed Nassau after the duke of that area.

Geography

Rensselaer County is in the eastern part of New York State. The eastern boundary of Rensselaer County runs along the New York–Vermont and New York–Massachusetts borders.

The terrain runs from level and flat near the Hudson and then rises into the Rensselaer Plateau around Poestenkill and Sand Lake, then to the Taconic Mountains along the Massachusetts state line.

The Hoosic River, a tributary of the Hudson River, is in the northern part of the county.

Adjacent counties
 Washington County — north
 Bennington County, Vermont — northeast
 Berkshire County, Massachusetts — east
 Columbia County — south
 Greene County — southwest
 Albany County — west
 Saratoga County — northwest

Demographics

As of the census of 2010, there were 159,429 people, 62,694 households, and 39,989 families residing in the county. The population density was 233 people per square mile (90/km2). There were 69,120 housing units at an average density of 109 per square mile (39/km2). The racial makeup of the county was 88.73% White, 7.14% Black or African American, 0.23% Native American, 1.71% Asian, 0.02% Pacific Islander, 0.89% from other races, and 1.34% from two or more races. 5.01% of the population were Hispanic or Latino of any race. 22.3% were of Irish, 14.7% Italian, 12.8% German, 7.5% English, 6.2% French, 5.3% American and 2.3% Puerto Rican ancestry according to Census 2010. 95.4% spoke English and 2.7% Spanish as their first language.

There were 61,094 households, out of which 33.30% had children under the age of 18 living with them, 46.80% were married couples living together, 12.00% had a female householder with no husband present, and 34.80% were non-families. 27.90% of all households were made up of individuals, and 10.30% had someone living alone who was 65 years of age or older. The average household size was 2.46 and the average family size was 3.02.

In the county, the population was spread out, with 24.20% under the age of 18, 10.10% from 18 to 24, 29.10% from 25 to 44, 23.00% from 45 to 64, and 13.60% who were 65 years of age or older. The median age was 37 years. For every 100 females there were 95.90 males. For every 100 females age 18 and over, there were 93.70 males.

The median income for a household in the county was $42,905, and the median income for a family was $52,864. Males had a median income of $36,666 versus $28,153 for females. The per capita income for the county was $21,095. About 6.70% of families and 9.50% of the population were below the poverty line, including 11.90% of those under age 18 and 6.60% of those age 65 or over.

2020 census

Government and politics

|}

From 1884 through the 1988 campaign, voters in 
Rensselaer County chiefly supported the Republican candidate, though the county has since swung to a majority voting for the Democrat, with Donald Trump in 2016 the sole Republican to carry the county since. 

Beginning in 1791, Rensselaer County was governed by a Board of Supervisors, which acted as the Legislature, with the chairman of the board serving as a de facto Executive.  The Board of Supervisors form of government was terminated as a result of a class action lawsuit brought by Troy attorney Marvin I. Honig on behalf of his wife, Nedda, during March 1968.  Mr. Honig brought this lawsuit to declare that the Board of Supervisors, as constituted, violated the "one man, one vote" principal declared by the United States Supreme Court.  Mr. Honig's motive in bringing the lawsuit was to punish the Rensselaer County Republican Party chairman and certain members of the Board of Supervisors for defaulting on an agreement with him. The NY Supreme Court ruled in Honig's favor, and ordered the creation of a legislative body.  Several plans were offered, but a plan proposed by Honig was adopted by the Court, and its decision was affirmed by the Appellate Division and Court of Appeals.  The first "Honig Plan" was drawn to favor the Democratic party, which had not had control of the county government in decades.  That plan, which controlled the 1969 election, resulted in the Democrats winning control of the new Rensselaer County Legislature.  Thereafter, following a change of leadership in the Republican party, Honig brought a new plan, drawn to favor Republican candidates, to the court, which adopted his revised plan.  The second "Honig Plan" was affirmed by the Appellate Division and the Court of Appeals.  The Republican candidates won back the County Legislature in the 1971 election, and Honig became the Renssselaer County Attorney, a position he held for well over a decade.  A full explanation of the creation of the Rensselaer County Legislature can be found at http://nassau-stories.blogspot.com/2006/04/reapportionment.html. See also: The Troy Record, July 8, 1971, page 1.

In 1970, the Rensselaer County Legislature was created, which elected Edward J. "Ned" Quinn as chairman. The Chairman served as the equivalent to an executive until the office of County Executive was created in 1972. Since its creation, Democrats have never won the office, although they controlled the Legislature until 1994. One notable candidate for Executive was Edward Pattison who was later elected to Congress, and whose son Mark served two terms as Mayor of Troy. The current county executive is Steve McLaughlin (R).   

Legislative authority is vested in the County Legislature, which consists of 19 members representing 17 different communities, separated into six districts. The current composition of the Legislature is as follows (ten Republicans, six Democrats, two Conservatives who caucus with the Republicans, and one Independent who caucuses with the Republicans):

District 1 – City of Troy:
  Cynthia B. Doran (D), Deputy Minority Leader
  Mark J. Fleming (D)
  Peter D. Grimm (D), Minority Leader
  Nina M. Nichols (D)
  Carole C. Weaver (D)
  Ken Zalewski (D)

District 2 – East Greenbush, North Greenbush, and Poestenkill:
  Robert W. Bayly (R), Vice Chairperson for Finance
  Leon B. Fiacco (R)
  Thomas Grant (R)
  Kelly Hoffman (C), Chairwoman

District 3 – Brunswick, Pittstown, and Schaghticoke:
  Dan Casale (R)
  Kenneth H. Herrington (R), Majority Leader
  William Maloney (R)

District 4 – Nassau, Sand Lake, and Schodack:
  Scott Bendett (R)
  Thomas Choquette (B)
  Robert R. Loveridge (R), Vice Chairperson

District 5 – Berlin, Grafton, Hoosick, Hoosick Falls, Petersburgh, and Stephentown:
  Bruce Patire (R)
  Jeffrey Wysocki (R)

District 6 – City of Rensselaer:
  Brian Stall (C)

 the current sheriff is Patrick A. Russo. Notably, Russo was the only sheriff in the state to embrace Immigration and Nationality Act Section 287(g), which authorizes local and county law enforcement to detain undocumented immigrants.

Education
The county is serviced by 16 school districts.  Some are completely contained in the county while some cross county lines into other counties. No school districts cross either the Vermont or Massachusetts state borders.  Below is a table that shows the districts within the county, which BOCES they belong to, and which other counties they may serve.

The county is also home to Rensselaer Polytechnic Institute, the oldest operating technological college in America.

Communities

Cities
 Rensselaer
 Troy (county seat)

Towns

 Berlin
 Brunswick
 East Greenbush
 Grafton
 Hoosick
 Nassau
 North Greenbush
 Petersburgh
 Pittstown
 Poestenkill
 Sand Lake
 Schaghticoke
 Schodack
 Stephentown

Villages
 Castleton-on-Hudson (Castleton)
 East Nassau
 Hoosick Falls
 Nassau
 Schaghticoke
 Valley Falls

Census-designated places
 Averill Park
 East Greenbush
 Hampton Manor
 Nassau Lake
 Poestenkill
 West Sand Lake
 Wynantskill

Hamlets

 Cherry Plain
 Cropseyville
 Defreestville
 Eagle Bridge
 East Schodack
 Johnsonville
 Melrose
 Schodack Center
 Speigletown
 Taborton
 Wyomanock

See also

 List of counties in New York
 List of county routes in Rensselaer County, New York
 National Register of Historic Places listings in Rensselaer County, New York

Notes

References

Further reading

External links

 Rensselaer County homepage
 
 Hudson Valley Directory, listings pertaining to Rensselaer County, New York
 Rensselaer County Sheriff's Department

 
1791 establishments in New York (state)
New York (state) counties
Populated places established in 1791